Chalvai is a village in Mulugu district, Telangana state, India.

Villages in Mulugu district